Fioretta Dolfi (born 19 October 1920) was an Italian stage and film actress.

Selected filmography
 The Lady Is Fickle (1942)
 Annabella's Adventure (1943)

References

Bibliography
 Lancia, Enrico. Amedeo Nazzari. Gremese Editore, 1983.

External links

1920 births
Possibly living people
Actors from Genoa
Italian film actresses
Italian stage actresses
Living people on EN wiki who are dead on other wikis from March 2019